Roland Zajmi (born 6 November 1973 in Tiranë) is an Albanian retired footballer who played the majority of his career in Greece with Proodeftiki, Atromitos, Kassandra, Agios Dimitrios and Pierikos. He also played for Dinamo/Olimpik Tirana and Partizani Tirana in Albania, Apollon Limassol in Cyprus as well as the Albania national team.

Club career
Zajmi made his senior debut for hometown club Dinamo Tirana in the 1993/94 season and signed for Greek Proodeftiki, the club where he would spend most of his career, in July 1996. He appeared in 145 Alpha Ethniki matches for Proodeftiki from 1996 through 2004.

International career
He made his debut for Albania in a November 1995 friendly match against Bosnia and earned a total of 4 caps, scoring 1 goal, including three friendlies in 2000. He scored against Andorra and his final international was a February 2002 Rothmans International Tournament match against Malta.

References

External links
 

1973 births
Living people
Footballers from Tirana
Albanian footballers
Association football forwards
Albania international footballers
FK Dinamo Tirana players
FK Partizani Tirana players
Proodeftiki F.C. players
Atromitos F.C. players
Apollon Limassol FC players
Pierikos F.C. players
Super League Greece players
Cypriot First Division players
Albanian expatriate footballers
Expatriate footballers in Greece
Albanian expatriate sportspeople in Greece
Expatriate footballers in Cyprus
Albanian expatriate sportspeople in Cyprus